Branko de Telleria (born November 12, 1991), nicknamed Cigarro (in English: cigar), is an Argentine football goalkeeper who currently plays for Huracán in the Argentine Primera División.

References

External links 
 

1991 births
Living people
Association football goalkeepers
Argentine footballers
Argentine Primera División players
Club Atlético Huracán footballers